Georgy Ivanovich Shpak was the governor of Ryazan Oblast, Russia from 2004 to 2008.

He was the commander of Russian Airborne Troops from 1996 to 2003.

Biography

Early life
Born September 8, 1943, in Osipovichi, Mogilev region USSR to Ivan Antonovich, who worked the railroad during his lifetime, and Anna Akimovna, who worked as an accountant.

He enrolled and graduated from the Minsk Railway School majoring in locomotive engineering, locksmithing and as an electrician for locomotives.

Military career
 Shpak served as a soldier for six months in the 137th Guards Airborne Regiment in Ryazan, then entered the Ryazan Higher Airborne Command School, from which he graduated with honors in 1966 and was appointed commander of the cadet platoon.

In 1970 he became a company commander of cadets at the school, and in 1973 he became lecturer at the department of tactics. Six months later he was appointed battalion commander in the 44th Airborne Training Division in the Baltic area.

After graduating in 1978 from the M. V. Frunze Military Academy. Shpak commanded the famous 350th Guards Airborne Regiment and deployed with it to Afghanistan on December 25, 1979.

He participated in combat operations in the Republic of Afghanistan (as commander of the 350th Guards Airborne Regiment), Yugoslavia and Chechnya.

After graduating in 1988 from the Military Academy of the General Staff, he became the first deputy commander of a Combined Arms Army in the Odessa Military District.

District commands
In 1989, Shpak became the commander of the 6th Army of the Leningrad Military District, and was later the chief of staff and first deputy commander of the Turkestan Military District. Since 1992 he was chief of staff to the first deputy commander of the Volga Military District. From December 4, 1996, to September 8, 2003, he was Commander of the Russian Airborne Forces.

Retirement and political career
In September 2003, after leaving the military service, he announced his intention to engage in politics and joined the people's patriotic bloc, and later - the Rodina party, in which he remained until October 2004. On December 7, 2003, was reelected to the Federal Assembly of Russia, where he became deputy chairman of the Defense Committee. In March 2004, ahead of the opponent in the second round, scored 53.5% of the votes and was elected governor of the Ryazan Oblast, where he remained until 2008.

Citations and orders

Orders:
  Order "For Merit to the Fatherland" IV degree
  Order of Military Merit
  Order of the Red Banner
  Order for Service to the Homeland in the Armed Forces of the USSR – III degree
  Order of St. Vladimir – III degree

Medals:
  "Medal for Battle Merit"
  Medal "Army General Margelov" (Ministry of Defense)

Certificates:
  Russian Federation Presidential Certificate of Honour

Local awards:
 Order "National Glory"(Moscow)
 Order "For the revival of Russia in the 21st Century" international competition "Pilar" (Foundation" Unity leaders of the domestic production in small, medium and large businesses", Moscow)
 Medal "For faultless work " (non-profit partnership "Coordination Center of security and detective agencies", Ryazan)
 Order of the "Holy Emperor Nicholas II" 2nd degree (League revive the traditions of the Russian monarchy, Moscow)
 Order of the Holy Prince Peter and Fevronia degree I (Regional Public Organization in strengthening marriage and family "People's Club" Family") "for military feat in saving lives and families"

Honorary titles:
 Honorary citizen of Osipovichi
 Distinguished graduate Samara State Aerospace University (KuAI-SGAU)

Personal life

Family
He is married to his wife, Alla, with whom he has a son, Guards Lieutenant Oleg, who was killed in 1995, in the First Chechen War and daughter, Yelena, who achieved the rank of colonel of medical service (N.N. Burdenko Military Hospital). He has three grandchildren, Oleg, Anna and Alexander.

Other
In December 2011, he published a biographical book General Georgy Shpak, written by a friend and colleague, Boris Kostin.

References

Spak, Hieorhij
People of the Chechen wars
Personnel of the Soviet Airborne Forces
Living people
Governors of Ryazan Oblast
Russian colonel generals
Recipients of the Order of Military Merit (Russia)
Recipients of the Order of the Red Banner
1943 births
20th-century Russian politicians
21st-century Russian politicians
Ryazan Guards Higher Airborne Command School alumni
Frunze Military Academy alumni
Military Academy of the General Staff of the Armed Forces of the Soviet Union alumni
Fourth convocation members of the State Duma (Russian Federation)